Thomas Shaw (1846 – June 23, 1895) was a Buffalo Soldier in the United States Army and a recipient of America's highest military decoration – the Medal of Honor – for his actions in the Indian Wars of the western United States.

Biography
Thomas Shaw was born into slavery in Covington, Kentucky in 1846. Shaw's owner moved him to Pike County, Missouri, and from there, Shaw escaped his owner and walked into a Union Army recruiting station. Shaw was stationed with the 67th U.S. Colored Troops in 1864 and stayed with the Army after the Civil War. 

By August 12, 1881, was serving as a Sergeant in Company K of the 9th Cavalry Regiment. On that day he participated in the Battle of Carrizo Canyon at Carrizo Canyon in New Mexico. The 9th Cavalry were in pursuit of Nana and his band of Apache warriors (Victorio's War). For his actions during the engagement, Shaw was awarded the Medal of Honor nine years later, on December 7, 1890.

Shaw retired from the Army in 1894 and settled in Rosslyn, Virginia.

Shaw died in 1895, leaving a wife and a daughter and was buried in Arlington National Cemetery, Arlington County, Virginia.

Medal of Honor citation
Rank and organization: Sergeant, Company K, 9th U.S. Cavalry. Place and date: At Carrizo Canyon, N. Mex., August 12, 1881. Entered service at: Pike County, Mo. Birth: Covington, Ky. Date of issue: December 7, 1890.

Citation
Forced the enemy back after stubbornly holding his ground in an extremely exposed position and prevented the enemy's superior numbers from surrounding his command.

See also

List of African American Medal of Honor recipients
List of Medal of Honor recipients for the Indian Wars

Notes

References

 

1846 births
1895 deaths
Buffalo Soldiers
American people of the Indian Wars
United States Army Medal of Honor recipients
United States Army soldiers
People from Covington, Kentucky
Burials at Arlington National Cemetery
American Indian Wars recipients of the Medal of Honor